The Eichbaum beer brewing company is located in Mannheim, Baden-Württemberg in Germany. It was founded in 1679 by Mannheim's Councillor Jean du Chêne (which means "Oak tree", or "Eichbaum" in German).

Today, the Eichbaum brewing company is owned by Actris AG. Dietmar Hopp, one founder of SAP AG, also owns Actris.

In Mannheim, the beer is sometimes lovingly called corpse water. The brewery is located next to a graveyard and the brewing water is directly pumped from the earth. However, this has no impact on the water quality, because several waterproof clays protect the fountain water against impurities. During the time that University of Maryland University College had a campus in Mannheim, this beer was a popular choice among its students. In some graduation ceremonies Eichbaum representatives had been invited.

Brands 

Eichbaum Brauerei, Mannheim
 Eichbaum Ureich Premium Pils
 Eichbaum Ureich Lager
 Eichbaum Pilsener
 Eichbaum Export
 Eichbaum HefeWeizen hell
 Eichbaum HefeWeizen dunkel
 Eichbaum KristallWeizen
 Eichbaum Leichter Typ
 Eichbaum Original Radler
 Eichbaum Kurpfälzer Helles
 Eichbaum Kellerbier
 Eichbaum Rotes Räuberbier
 Eichbaum Kläänes Pils
 Eichbaum Goldener Germane (Beer of the Year 2012)
 Eichbaum Apostulator (Doppelbock-Beer)
 Eichbaum Winterbier
 Eichbaum Braumeisters Limonade (Zitrone Naturtrüb, Orange-Malz, Wilder Holunder)
 Eichbaum Braumeisters Brand (Mirabelle-Malz, Williams-Malz)
 Feuerio-Tropfen 
 Apostelbräu
 Eichbaum Ureich Premium Pils Alcohol Free
 Karamalz

External links
 Eichbaum home page
 

1679 establishments in the Holy Roman Empire
Breweries in Germany
Breweries in Baden-Württemberg
Companies based in Baden-Württemberg
Companies based in Mannheim